Kalle M. Saksela (born September 10, 1962, in Philadelphia, Pennsylvania, US) is a Finnish virologist. He has been a professor at University of Helsinki since 2005, where he leads the virology department.

Biography and work 
in 1989 Saksela obtained his MD and PhD from the University of Helsinki under the supervision of Kari Alitalo. In 1989/1990 Saksela was research fellow with Helsinki's department of virology. In 1991 Saksela worked as a postdoctoral fellow with David Baltimore at the Whitehead Institute for Biomedical Research, Cambridge, Massachusetts, and then followed him to the Rockefeller University. There he worked as an assistant professor From 1994 to 1996. After that he returned to Finland to become a professor for molecular medicine with the Institute for Medical Technology at the University of Tampere, but until 2000 he also remained an adjunct professor with James E. Darnell's laboratory at The Rockefeller University. 2005 Saksela moved to Helsinki to become a professor of virology at the University of Helsinki and the chairman of its virology department. In addition he also became the chief physician of the University Hospital's HUSLAB.

In 2002 Saksela was awarded the Anders Jahre Prize for Young Scientists by the University of Oslo for his research on Aids. In 2003 he became a member of the Finnish Academy of Science and Letters.

His father, Eero Saksela, is an emeritus professor of medicine.

COVID-19-related research 
Saksela and coworkers developed during the spring of 2020 a patent free COVID-19 vaccine, which uses an adenovirus as a delivery system for genetic information to trigger the production of the spike protein of SARS-CoV-2. While being successful in animal trials the project could not secure funding for large human trials. Later in the year Saksela co-founded Rokote Laboratories with researches of the University of Eastern Finland to develop a nasal spray that can be used to administer the COVID-19 vaccine.

References

External links
Kalle Saksela at the website of the University of Helsinki

1962 births
Living people
Finnish virologists
Academic staff of the University of Helsinki
Members of the Finnish Academy of Science and Letters